Anmod  is a village in Karnataka state of India at the Goa-Karnataka border. Anmod village lies on Belgaum- Goa road route. The Goa state can be reached by descending Anmod Ghat from Karnataka. The NH 748 or 4B highway from Goa up to Goa Karnataka border is good. After that in Karnataka due to incomplete bridge works at many places the road is missing, bad deep pot holes, muddy puddles. If car is stuck or punctured then no vehicular traffic to take help and jungle area with signs of possibilities of animals crossing roads. Best to avoid road. Panaji to Belgaum highway via mollem and anmod ghat road condition. Some of the oldest rocks in the Indian subcontinent are found in Anmod on Goa's border with Karnataka. The rocks are classified as Trondjemeitic Gneiss estimated to be 3,600 million years old, dated by the Rubidium isotope dating method.

Visitor Information 
The Shangri-la Jungle Village Resort near Anmod offers high-end foreign tourism experiences including forest trekking, elephant rides and tribal music.

See also 
Kankumbi
Londa
Dandeli

References

Villages in Uttara Kannada district